Karkaraly Range is a range of mountains in Karkaraly District, Karaganda Region, Kazakhstan.

Karkaraly city lies at the feet of the eastern slopes of the mountains. A large sector of the range is part of the Karkaraly National Park, a  protected area established in 1998.

Geography 
The Karkaraly Range is one of the subranges of the Kazakh Upland system (Saryarka). It rises to the northwest of the smaller, but higher, Kent Range. The larger Kyzyltas range rises to the southwest. The mountains are deeply dissected by valleys and ravines. There are numerous small lakes, such as Pasheno and Shaytankol within the range, as well as Bolshoye, Zhartas and Ashchykol at the feet of the mountains.

The main rivers having their sources in the range are the Sarsu, Taldy and Tundak.

Flora
The range is covered by pine forests as well as steppe vegetation made up of coarse feathergrass and forb grassland areas.

See also
Geography of Kazakhstan

References

External links

Visit Kazakhstan
Kazakh Uplands